Pursurah (also spelled Pursura) is a village in the Pursurah CD block in the Arambag subdivision of Hooghly district in the Indian state of West Bengal.

Geography

Location

Area overview
The Arambagh subdivision, presented in the map alongside, is divided into two physiographic parts – the Dwarakeswar River being the dividing line. The western part is upland and rocky – it is extension of the terrain of neighbouring Bankura district. The eastern part is flat alluvial plain area.  The railways, the roads and flood-control measures have had an impact on the area. The area is overwhelmingly rural with 94.77% of the population living in rural areas and 5.23% of the population living in urban areas.

Note: The map alongside presents some of the notable locations in the subdivision. All places marked in the map are linked in the larger full screen map.

Demographics
According to the 2011 Census of India, Pursura had a total population of 7,225 of which 3,681 (51%) were males and 3,544 (49%) were females. Population in the age range 0–6 years was 767. The total number of literate persons in Pursura was 5,341 (82.70% of the population over 6 years).

Civic administration

Police station
Pursurah police station has jurisdiction over the Pursurah CD block.

CD block HQ
The headquarters of Pursurah CD block are located at Pursurah.

References

Villages in Hooghly district